Dymphna is a Christian saint honoured in Catholic and Eastern Orthodox traditions. According to tradition, she lived in the 7th century and was martyred by her father.

The story of Dymphna was first recorded in the 13th century by a canon of the Church of Aubert of Avranches at Cambrai, France. It was commissioned by Guiard of Laon, the Bishop of Cambrai (1238-1248).

The author expressly stated that his work was based upon a long-standing oral tradition as well as a persuasive history of miraculous healings of the mentally ill.

Name
Dymphna's name (pronounced   or  ) derives from the Irish  ('poet') and suffix -ait ('little' or 'feminine'), therefore meaning 'poetess'. It is also spelled Dimpna,  Dymphnart, Dympna or Damnat, this last closer to the Irish spelling Damhnait (pronounced ).

Story of her life and death

According to Catholic and Orthodox tradition, Dymphna was born in Ireland in the 7th century. Dymphna's father Damon was a petty king of Oriel. Her mother was a devout Christian.

When Dymphna was 14 years old, she consecrated herself to Christ and took a vow of chastity. Shortly thereafter, her mother died. Damon had loved his wife deeply, and in the aftermath of her death his mental health sharply deteriorated. Eventually the king's counsellors pressed him to remarry. Damon agreed, but only on the condition that his bride would be as beautiful as his deceased wife. After searching fruitlessly, Damon began to desire his daughter because of her strong resemblance to her mother.

When Dymphna learned of her father's intentions, she swore to uphold her vows and fled his court along with her confessor Father Gerebernus, two trusted servants, and the king's fool. Together they sailed towards the continent, eventually landing in what is present-day Belgium, where they took refuge in the town of Gheel.

One tradition states that once settled in Geel, Dymphna built a hospice for the poor and sick of the region. However, it was through the use of her wealth that her father would eventually ascertain her whereabouts, as some of the coins used enabled her father to trace them to Belgium. Damon sent his agents to pursue his daughter and her companions. When their hiding place was discovered, Damon travelled to Geel to recover his daughter. Damon ordered his soldiers to kill Gerebernus and tried to force Dymphna to return with him to Ireland, but she resisted. Furious, Damon drew his sword and struck off his daughter's head. She was said to have been 15 years old when she died.  After Dymphna and Gerebernus were killed, the residents of Geel buried them in a nearby cave. Years later, they decided to move the remains to a more suitable location. 

In 1349 a church honouring Dymphna was built in Geel. By 1480, so many pilgrims were coming from all over Europe, seeking treatment for psychiatric disorders that the church housing for them was expanded. Soon the sanctuary for those considered “mad” was again full to overflowing, and the townspeople began taking them into their own homes. Thus began a tradition for the ongoing care of those with psychiatric conditions that has endured for over 500 years and is still studied and admired today. Patients were, and still are, taken into the homes of Geel's inhabitants.  Never called patients, they are called boarders, and are treated as ordinary and useful members of the town. They are treated as members of the host family. They work, most often in menial labour, and in return, they become part of the community. Some stay a few months, some decades, some for their entire lives. At its peak in the 1930s, over 4,000 'boarders' were housed with the town's inhabitants.

Veneration

The remains of Dymphna were later put into a silver reliquary and placed in a church in Geel named in her honour. The remains of Gerebernus were moved to Xanten, Germany. During the late 15th century the original St. Dymphna Church in Geel burned down. A second "Church of St. Dymphna" was then built and consecrated in 1532. The church still stands on the site where her body is believed to have first been buried.

According to nineteenth-century Irish Catholic priest John Canon O'Hanlon, the commemoration of Dymphna's and of Gerebern's arrival at Antwerp was celebrated on April 11, according to a Carthusian Martyrology, however their chief feast day was on May 15, the day of their final martyrdom. According to tradition, miracles occurred immediately after Dymphna's tomb was discovered.

Dymphna is known as the Lily of Éire, due to her spotless virtue. She is traditionally portrayed wearing a crown, dressed in ermine and royal robes, and holding a sword. In modern versions she holds the sword awkwardly, as it symbolises her martyrdom, but in the older versions seen on numerous statues and stained glass images, her sword is pricking the neck of a demon; symbolising her title of Demon Slayer. She is also often portrayed holding a lamp, with the chained devil at her feet.

Some modern holy cards portray Dymphna in green and white, holding a book and white lilies.

During the 2022 season, the St Dymphna's Church, Geel, Belgium, is hosting an exposition showing the restored altarpiece venerating Dymphna by Goossen Van der Weyden.

Patronage

Dymphna is the patron saint of mental illness.

The US National Shrine of St. Dymphna is located inside St. Mary's Catholic Church in Massillon, Ohio. The shrine was destroyed by a fire in 2015, but reopened in December 2016 and is still open to pilgrims and visitors.  St. Dymphna's Special School is located in Ballina, County Mayo, Republic of Ireland and operates under the patronage of Western Care Association.

See also
List of Catholic saints

References

External links

7th-century deaths
7th-century Christian saints
7th-century Irish people
7th-century Irish women
Child abuse resulting in death
Christian child saints
Christian female saints of the Middle Ages
Deaths by decapitation
Female saints of medieval Ireland
Incest
Irish expatriates in Belgium
Irish people murdered abroad
Medieval Irish saints
Murdered Irish children
People from County Monaghan
People from Geel
People murdered in Belgium
Miracle workers
Year of birth uncertain
Year of birth unknown
Violence against women in Belgium
Female murder victims